Anthony Douglas Weston (born 3 April 1946) is an English former professional footballer. He spent his entire professional career with Gillingham, where he made over 160 Football League appearances.

References

1946 births
Living people
English footballers
Gillingham F.C. players
Ashford United F.C. players
Maidstone United F.C. (1897) players
Ebbsfleet United F.C. players
Folkestone F.C. players
Tonbridge Angels F.C. players

Association football defenders